Brooklyn is a 2015 historical drama film directed by John Crowley. Writer Nick Hornby adapted the screenplay from Colm Tóibín's novel of the same name. The plot follows Eilis Lacey (Saoirse Ronan), a young Irish woman who emigrates to Brooklyn to find employment. There she marries an Italian plumber called Tony (Emory Cohen), before being forced to choose between her home town of Enniscorthy or her new life in Brooklyn. The film premiered at the 2015 Sundance Film Festival. It was released by Fox Searchlight Pictures in a limited capacity on 6 November 2015.

Brooklyn gathered awards and nominations in a variety of categories with particular praise for Ronan's performance, Crowley's direction and Hornby's screenplay. The film received 3 nominations at the 88th Academy Awards and 6 nominations at the 69th British Academy Film Awards. At the British Independent Film Awards, the film earned 5 nominations, with Ronan going on to win Best Actress. The film also garnered five nominations at the 21st Critics' Choice Awards. Brooklyn was named Best Irish Film by the Dublin Film Critics' Circle and nominated for four accolades by the London Film Critics' Circle. The film's production designer François Séguin won the Best Production Design award from the San Diego Film Critics Society, where Brooklyn was nominated for a further six awards.

Ronan has won Best Actress awards for her performance as Eilis from the Hollywood Film Awards, New York Film Critics Circle, San Francisco Film Critics Circle and the Washington D.C. Area Film Critics Association. She is further nominated for the Golden Globe Award for Best Actress in a Drama Motion Picture, a Satellite Award and a Screen Actors Guild Award. Brooklyn was included in Dallas–Fort Worth Film Critics Association and the New York Film Critics Online Top 10 Films. It was also awarded the People's Choice Award for Best Narrative Feature at the Denver Film Festival, the Audience Favorite Gold Award in World Cinema at the Mill Valley Film Festival, the Rogers People's Choice Award at the Vancouver International Film Festival and the Audience Award for Best Narrative Feature at the Virginia Film Festival. Hornby's script received a USC Scripter Award nomination for Best Adapted Screenplay.

Awards and nominations

Notes
 Certain award groups do not simply award one winner. They recognize several different recipients and have runners-up. Since this is a specific recognition and is different from losing an award, runner-up mentions are considered wins in this award tally.

 Each date is linked to the article about the awards held that year, wherever possible.

References

External links
 

Lists of accolades by film